Roberto Grigis (born 16 September 1962 in Bergamo, Italy) is a retired Italian alpine skier who competed in the 1984 Winter Olympics.

References

External links
 

 

1962 births
Living people
Italian male alpine skiers
Olympic alpine skiers of Italy
Alpine skiers at the 1984 Winter Olympics
Sportspeople from Bergamo
20th-century Italian people